Rangpur Cadet College is a military college for boys in Rangpur, Bangladesh, having about 300 cadets, 50 in each grade from 7th to 12th.

History
A cadet college is an institution following the model of English public schools. In 1979, Rangpur Cadet College was established as the sixth cadet college of Bangladesh. The former Rangpur Residential Model High School was converted into a cadet college with some infrastructural modification. The land now owned by the college is partially taken from the Carmichael College, an educational college which stands beside it. The college started with its first three batches (called the intake) in 7th, 8th and 9th grade in 1979. Commander Habibur Rahman was the first principal of this institution. Krittiranjan Chakma was the first adjutant and Hossain Sohel Shahnewaz was the first College Prefect of the CCR (who was assassinated on the 25 February 2009 in the BDR mutiny). From 2003, English was introduced as the medium of education as per a government decision to convert the cadet colleges into the English versions. The 28th intake was the first batch in the English version.

Campus

Rangpur Cadet College is located in Rangpur. The college is outside the main city in a suburban area. It is 5 km south of the City Center, and situated beside the Dhaka-Rangpur highway. Long trees made the place more attractive and a canal passes through the campus.

The main features of the campus are:
 Main academic building
 Residential houses for cadets
 Birsreshtho Mostafa auditorium
 Birsreshtho Matiur dining hall
 Mosque
 Birsreshtho Nur Mohammad  Hospital.
 Three basic playgrounds
 Five basketball grounds.
 Five volleyball grounds

Curriculum and teaching process
The institute follows the curriculum provided by the National Curriculum and Textbook Board. It provides teaching in Sciences and Humanities group. The subjects under the Commerce group are not available for study in the institution. The institute has followed the English version of the curriculum from 2003. The institute is under Dinajpur Education Board.

This institute provides educations from 7th grade to 12 grade only. The students appear for the Junior Secondary Certificate (JSC), Secondary School Certificate (SSC), and the Higher Secondary Certificate (HSC) exams from the college.

Administrative structure 
Cadet colleges are known for their strict and disciplined administration. The administration is run by a strict set of procedures which are  common to all the cadet colleges. The cadets are divided into three houses, Omar Faruque, Titumir, and Birshrestha Jahangir. They participate in competitions on behalf of their house, and the houses are credited according to the achievements and discipline of the cadets.

College administration 
The college administration is run under the supervision of a principal appointed either from the Bangladesh Armed Forces or from the faculty members. An adjutant and a Medical Officer from Armed Forces monitor the disciplinary/administrative activities and Health and Sanitary issues respectively. The academic activities are supervised by the Vice-Principal. The Principal is Colonel Kazi Tazul Islam (Ex cadet of MCC). and the Vice Principal is Mr. Md. Wahid Ullah The Adjutant is Major Mohammad Tauhidur Rahman(Ex cadet of CCR) and the Medical Officer is Captain Mehedi Hasan Himel (AMC).

Cadets appointments/prefects 
Cadets are appointed as Prefects, chosen from the senior-most class after the departure of a batch. They are inaugurated by College Principal, Adjutant and Vice Principal in the college auditorium. According to seniority prefects are as follows:

 College Prefect (leads almost 300 cadets, maintains the overall discipline, and works as a bridge between cadets and the administrative board)
 3 House Prefects (leads each of the houses of 100 cadets)
 College Games Prefect (in charge of the college games)
 College Cultural Prefect (in charge of cultural affairs)
 College Dining Hall and Mosque Prefect (in charge of dining and mosque discipline matters)
 3 Assistant House Prefects (assists each of the house prefects)
 3 House Games Prefects
 3 House Cultural Prefects

Houses
The Current Champion House is Titumir House

Extracurricular activities
Cadets participate with the other houses in cultural, athletic, literary, and music competitions. In the playground, they play cricket, football, volleyball, basketball, and athletics as practice or as competition. According to the result of all the competitions, the overall champion house is determined.

The largest event in the college is the annual athletics competition held at the end of the year. Cadets participate in a major literary and cultural competition and one sports competition held every year among all the cadet colleges of Bangladesh.

Success in national and international arena

 Cadet Sarfin of 42nd Intake stood first in Dinajpur Board in the SSC Exam of 2020.
Cadet Mahee of 44th Intake stood first in Dinajpur Board in the JSC Exam of 2019.
Rangpur Cadet College become champion in "Inter Cadet College Cricket Meet-2019", which took place in Jhenaidah Cadet College.
Cadet Labib of 41 intake achieved the best position paper in International MUN-2019 held in BUP(Bangladesh University of Professional)
 In 2008 at the tenth national TV school debate held in BTV, a team led by Cadet Galib (30th Intake) became the champion. The other members of the team were Cadet Mootasir (31st Intake) and Cadet Khaled (31st Intake). Cadet Galib also became the best debater of the competition. 
In 2019 at GEIST global summit on education -2019 held by ADAMAS university of India Cadet Jubayer from 41 intake achieved the glory of best poster paper presentation in whole Indian continent
 A student became the best debater and a student fifth-ranked debater in the country in 2008.
 In 2007 in the ninth national TV debate a team of three cadets was runners up. 
 In 2008 a team led by Cadet Zia Noor Nabi (28th Intake) along with Cadet Yahiya Saleh (29th Intake) and Cadet Sharif (29th Intake) became second runners up in 'Juktikothon: ATN Bangla National Debate Championship' under the sponsorship of BSB and Cambrian College.
 A cadet became the best debater in the country at the school level winning in the 'National Baroari (12) Debate' while a cadet got the fifth position.
 The first team sent from Rangpur Cadet College to the National TV debate competition at school level in 2002 secured the third position.

Admission procedure
Every year the cadet colleges of Bangladesh take one new intake in class Seven. Only 50 to 55 new cadets are selected from all over the country for each cadet college through a nationwide examination.

The admission process usually starts toward the end of the year to accept new cadets for class 7 only. Written admission exams for all 12 cadet colleges are held on the same day throughout the country. Those who pass the written exam are called for oral/viva tests and medical tests. Based on the results of all three tests, the top 50/55 cadets are given admission to that cadet college.

Alumni
 Major General Md Enayet Ullah of the Bangladesh Army

Reference

External links

 
 Rangpur Old Cadet's Association
 eROCA

Military high schools
1979 establishments in Bangladesh
Cadet colleges in Bangladesh
Rangpur, Bangladesh
Educational Institutions affiliated with Bangladesh Army
Colleges in Bangladesh
Educational institutions established in 1979